is a city located in Ōita Prefecture, Japan.

The modern city of Bungo-Ōno was established on March 31, 2005, from the merger between the towns of Asaji, Inukai, Mie, Ogata and Ōno, and the villages of Chitose and Kiyokawa (all from Ōno District).

As of March 1, 2017, the city has an estimated population of 35,811 and a population density of 59 persons per km². The total area is 603.36 km².

In 2012, the growing deer population began to greatly affect the shiitake mushroom farming industry.

Geography

Climate
Bungo-Ōno has a humid subtropical climate (Köppen climate classification Cfa) with hot summers and cool winters. Precipitation is significant throughout the year, but is somewhat lower in winter.

Demographics
Per Japanese census data, the population of Bungo-Ōno in 2020 is 33,695 people. Bungo-Ōno has been conducting censuses since 1960.

References

External links

Bungo-ōno City official website 

Cities in Ōita Prefecture